is a railway station of West Japan Railway Company (JR-West) in Kizugawa, Kyoto, Japan. Although the station is on the Kansai Main Line as rail infrastructure, it is served as terminal by both the Kansai Line and Yamatoji Line in terms of passenger train services.

Lines
  (Kansai Main Line)

Layout
The station has two island platforms with three tracks on the ground level.

Platforms

History
The station opened in 1897 as a station on the Kansai Railway, which connected Osaka and Nagoya via Nara. The Kansai Railway was nationalized in 1907 and became the Kansai Main Line. With the privatization of Japanese National Railways (JNR) on 1 April 1987, the station came under the control of JR West.

Passenger statistics
According to the Kyoto Prefecture statistical book, the average number of passengers per day is as follows.

See also
 List of railway stations in Japan

External links

  

Railway stations in Japan opened in 1897
Railway stations in Kyoto Prefecture